Domenico Bidognetti is a former member of the Casalesi clan from Casal di Principe in the province of Caserta between Naples and Salerno. He is a cousin of Casalesi boss, Francesco Bidognetti. He became a pentito and collaborated with Italian Justice in early 2008. His nickname is "Bruttaccione".

References

Living people
People from the Province of Caserta
Camorristi
Pentiti
Casalesi clan
Year of birth missing (living people)